South Cardiff Football Club is a semi-professional soccer club based in Cardiff South a suburb of Newcastle, Australia. The club was established in 1964 and currently competes in the Northern NSW State League Division 1. They are known as "The Gunners" after the nickname of London club Arsenal. The club in its current form celebrated its 50th anniversary in 2014 although there is historical records of South Cardiff Football Club back to the 1930s at least. South Cardiff was the first team to score in the Round of 32 national knockout competition the FFA CUP. In 2015, South Cardiff were relegated to the Northern NSW State League Division 1 for the 2016 season. The club's stated mission is to qualify for re-admission to the National Premier Leagues Northern NSW

In 2023 South Cardiff will field all teams from U9s to First Grade, with U13s-U18s competing in the Premier Youth League, Reserves and First Grade competing in HitFM Northern League 1 and U9s to U12s competing in Northern New South Wales Football's Junior Development Leagues

Ground
The club plays its home matches at the Ulinga Complex which is located at Cross Street Cardiff South. The Complex has four fields, two training and two match, all with floodlights for night games and training.

Coaching Staff
 Head Coach and 1st Grade Coach: Perry Mellon
 Assistant 1st Grade Coach: Sam Charlier
 Reserves Coach: Geoff Allan
Youth Technical Director: Perry Mellon
 U18s Coach: William Moriaty
 U16s Coach: Josh Hole
 U15s Coach: Brendan Wass
 U14s Coach: Chad Evans
 U13s Coach: Aidan Paintner
 JDL Technical Director: Aidan Paintner
 U12s Coach: Corey Fletcher and Jordan Pordage
 U11s Coach: Jordan Smallhorne
 U10s Coach: Brock Best
 U9s Coach: AJ Llewellyn

Club officials
 President: Rob Panther
 Vice-President: Joanne White
 Treasurer: Maxine Charlier
 Secretary: Natalie Gibson

Competition Timeline

Season cancelled early due to COVID-19 pandemic in Australia

Honours
 Second Division Premiers: 1997
 Youth State League Premiers: 2005
 U23 NBN State League Premiers: 2012
 Solo Cup: 2011
 Gallagher Shield: 2019, 2020
 State League Grand Final Runners Up: 2005, 2011
 U16 Premiers: 2022
 U14 Premiers: 2019
 U13 Premiers: 2019
 U16 Grand Final Winners: 2022
 U15 Grand Final Winners: 2018
 U14 Grand Final Winners: 2019

References

External links
 Club website

National Premier Leagues clubs
Soccer clubs in New South Wales
Association football clubs established in 1989
1989 establishments in Australia